Anzing is a municipality in the Upper Bavarian district of Ebersberg.

Geography

Municipal divisions
Constituent communities include Anzing, Auhofen, Boden, Froschkern, Frotzhofen, Garkofen, Hl. Kreuz, Höggerloh, Kaisersberg, Köppelmühle, Lindach, Mauerstetten, Obelfing, Oberasbach, Ranharting, Ried, Staudach, Unterasbach and Ziegelstadel.

History
In 812, the community had its first documentary mention “in loco anzinga”. Under administrative reforms in Bavaria in 1818, Anzing became an autonomous community.

Politics

Municipal council
The current council consists of 16 councillors from 6 groupings:
6 councillors, including the First Mayor, are from the CSU,
3 councillors are from the SPD,
3 councillors are from the UBA (Unabhängige Bürgergemeinschaft Anzing, Independent Citizens‘ Community),
2 councillors are from the AJA (Aktive Jugend Anzing),
1 councillor each comes from the Greens and the FWG (Freie Wählergemeinschaft Anzing, Anzing Free Voters’ Community)

Mayors
First Mayor: Richard Hollerith (CSU)
Second Mayor: Franz Finauer (UBA)
Third Mayor: Peter Moossmann (CSU)

Coat of arms
Anzing’s coat of arms might be described thus: In Or a lion rampant sable armed and langued gules, above which two crossed lily staffs (Lilienstäbe in German) azure.

Economy and infrastructure

Transport
Anzing has an interchange with Bundesautobahn 94, which will lead from Munich through Mühldorf am Inn to Passau, although as yet (May 2007) it is only partly finished. Anzing lies only about 22 km east of the state capital, Munich, 18 km south of Erding, 34 km from Munich airport and 14 km from Ebersberg.

Businesses established in town
Lidl Auslieferungslager
Auto König (Exklusiv Fahrzeug Händler)
MasterTent Deutschland
Industrielle Buchbinderei Bückers GmbH
and many other regional businesses.

Famous people
Sepp Maier, FC Bayern goalkeeper and for many years federal  goalkeeping trainer is known as the Katze von Anzing – the Cat from Anzing.

Gsindl, Bavarian rock band.

References

External links
Community’s homepage
Sport club‘s homepage

Ebersberg (district)